Hellquist is a Swedish surname. Notable people with the surname include:

Elof Hellquist (1864–1933), Swedish scientist
Elsa Hellquist (1886–1983), Swedish fencer
Hanna Hellquist (born 1980), Swedish journalist, television host and writer
Philip Hellquist (born 1991), Swedish footballer
Solveig Hellquist (born 1949), Swedish politician

Swedish-language surnames